Noxytiolin is an anti-infective used for irrigation of the peritoneum.

References

Thioureas